Lucimar Ferreira da Silva (born 8 May 1978), commonly known as Lúcio, is a Brazilian former professional footballer who played as a centre-back. A tall and physically strong defender who excelled in the air, Lúcio was known for his long, surging, galloping runs on the ball, which earned him the nickname O Cavalo ("The Horse").

Lúcio began his professional career in 1998 with Internacional. After three years in the club, he moved to Bayer Leverkusen, where he reached the 2002 UEFA Champions League final against Real Madrid of Spain. He scored a header in the final, which Real Madrid won with the score of 2–1. In 2004, he arrived at Bayern Munich, where he won three cups and three Bundesliga titles. Since coach Louis van Gaal did not have a place for him at Bayern, he decided to search for a new team. He moved to Inter Milan in the summer of 2009. He won the treble with Inter in 2010, helped them win the 2010 Champions League against his former club Bayern Munich.

With Brazil, Lúcio has accumulated a number of significant accomplishments, winning the 2002 World Cup, 2005 Confederations Cup and 2009 Confederations Cup. After the retirement of Kaká, he was the last active player of the 2002 winning team.

Club career

Early career
Lúcio started playing football for his hometown club Planaltina as a forward. In 1997, now playing as a defender, he was loaned to Guará, then current Campeonato Brasiliense champions, for their match against Internacional for 1997 Copa do Brasil. Despite a 0–7 home loss, he impressed the Porto Alegre club and was purchased.

Internacional
At Internacional, Lúcio later became a starting centre-back and had his best year in 2000, receiving his first call-up to the Brazil national team and being awarded the Bola de Prata as one of the two best centre-backs of the 2000 Campeonato Brasileiro.

Bayer Leverkusen
In January 2001, he moved to Bundesliga side Bayer Leverkusen. The following season was bittersweet for Leverkusen, as the club surrendered a five-point lead atop the Bundesliga by losing two of its last three matches while Borussia Dortmund swept ahead with three consecutive victories in the final matches to finish a point ahead of Leverkusen. They also experienced defeat in the 2002 DFB-Pokal Final, losing 4–2 to Schalke 04, and in the 2002 UEFA Champions League final against Real Madrid, in which Lúcio cancelled out Raúl's eighth-minute goal just five minutes later with a header, only for Zinedine Zidane to give Real a 2–1 win with a sublime volley just before half-time. Despite the disappointing end to the season, Lúcio's impressive individual displays drew the attention of several of Europe's top clubs. In July 2003, Roma made an official bid, but the deal fell through.

Bayern Munich
In 2004, Lúcio joined Bayern Munich on a six-year contract, where he became a vital part of the team. Following Oliver Kahn's retirement in 2008, Dutchman Mark van Bommel was named club captain with Lúcio as vice-captain. When Bayern were playing against Real Madrid in the Round of 16 in the 2006–07 Champions League, Lúcio scored. The goal was in the 66th minute, while the score was 1–0 in favour of Bayern. The goal took Bayern through to the quarter-finals, where they lost to eventual champions Milan. In the 2008–09 DFB-Pokal, he scored in the quarter-finals against his former club, Bayer Leverkusen. Bayern were already down 3–0 when he scored, and even though Miroslav Klose scored again, Lúcio's goal did not matter as Stefan Kießling scored again to win it for Leverkusen 4–2.

Inter Milan

On 16 July 2009, Lúcio moved to Italian club Inter Milan, signing a three-year contract with the Serie A champions. He was given the number 6 shirt. He scored his first goal with Inter on 23 September 2009 against Napoli with a header from a corner kick. Lúcio also scored an own goal in the UEFA Champions League in the group stages against Dynamo Kyiv, resulting in a draw. Throughout the season, both Lúcio and his defensive partner Walter Samuel drew praise for their performances, and on 22 May, Lúcio was in the Inter team that won the Champions League by defeating his former club Bayern Munich 2–0, to seal a historic treble and end a 45-year wait to be crowned European Champions. He was selected In the FIFA FIFPro World XI of 2010 For His Performances  On 24 September 2011, Lúcio made his 100th appearance in an Inter shirt, scoring the third of a 3–1 win at Bologna in Serie A matchday 5. On 29 June 2012, it was announced that Lúcio would be leaving Inter following a mutual agreement to terminate the final two years of his contract.

Juventus
On 4 July 2012, Lúcio signed a two-year contract with Serie A titleholders Juventus, adding him to the list of players to play for both Inter and Juventus. Although he was initially used as a starter in the club's three-man defence, featuring in Juventus's 4–2 victory over Napoli in the 2012 Supercoppa Italiana on 11 August, after struggling with injuries and producing some inconsistent performances, he was soon left out of the first-team in favour of the defensive trio of Giorgio Chiellini, Leonardo Bonucci and Andrea Barzagli. In total, he made only four appearances in all competitions during his next six months with the club: one in Serie A, two in the Champions League, and one in the Supercoppa Italiana. Due to this lack of playing time, Lúcio left Juventus on 17 December 2012, after his contract was terminated by mutual consent.

São Paulo
On 18 December 2012, one day after leaving Juventus, Lúcio signed for a two-year contract with Brazilian side São Paulo. After 12 years in Europe, he said that he needed to familiarize himself again with Brazil. He scored his first goal for São Paulo against Botafogo on 7 April 2013.

In July 2013, after a change of coaches in club – Ney Franco was replaced for Paulo Autuori – Lúcio was removed from team. The episode gained traction after the 1–0 loss against Internacional, in a Brazilian League match. Lúcio did not accept Paulo Autuori's criticism, that the Colorado goal, scored by Leandro Damião, would have been scored after a failure from former captain of Seleção Brasileira. This way, reporting an insubordination, Autuori preferred to take off Lúcio from his staff.

After his removal, Lúcio did not travel with the club to Germany to contest the 2013 Audi Cup. His presence at the friendly tournament was requested by his former club Bayern Munich, and without him São Paulo earned €40,000 less than initially accorded. The German side understood the explanations of the directors of the Brazilian club about the insubordination issues, but insisted on São Paulo's performance of contract.

Training apart from the main staff, Lúcio has become a "problem" to the club. He did not accept playing offers from clubs of Middle East and Japan, preferring to stay in Brazil, and did not receive proposals from other Brazilian teams. The directors of Tricolor did not want to sign his rescission, claiming about the high value to do this, however Lúcio was still earning a lucrative salary despite not playing. With defenders Antônio Carlos and Roger Carvalho arriving at the club, Lúcio effectively lost his chance at playing again, prompting efforts from São Paulo to transfer him to a European club before the transfer window closes; they were unsuccessful. In December 2013, after almost six months, Lúcio broke the silence and spoke about his poor relationship with the club: "I felt humiliated. I thought "Oh, my god, what did I do to deserve this?"

Palmeiras
On 1 January 2014, Lúcio broke his contract with São Paulo (originally to last until December 2014) and signed with Tricolor'''s rivals Palmeiras. Following the departure of former team captain and centre-back Henrique, an idol for the club, Lúcio will now play a major leadership role on the team's defensive group, alongside goalkeeper and current team captain Fernando Prass. Upon signing his contract, Lúcio agreed to only earn a third of the salary he had in at São Paulo, being further compensated through prizes based on his performance on the field.

 FC Goa 
On 7 June 2015, it was confirmed that Lúcio had signed for FC Goa of the Indian Super League as their marquee player. He made 14 appearances in his first season, as FC Goa finished as runners-up of the league. The following season was a lot less successful, with just five appearances from Lúcio and FC Goa finishing at the bottom of the table.

Later career
On 7 December 2017, Lúcio returned to his home district in Brazil and signed for Gama, captaining the club during the 2018 Campeonato Brasiliense. On 16 April 2018, Lúcio joined rivals Brasiliense.

Lúcio announced his retirement as a professional footballer on 29 January 2020.

International career

2000 Olympics
At junior level, he played for Brazil in the football tournament in the 2000 Olympics.

2002 World Cup
In the 2002 FIFA World Cup quarter-final match against England, Lúcio made a mistake that allowed Michael Owen to score the opening goal. Luiz Felipe Scolari defended him, stating that he had made no other mistakes. In the final against Germany, Lúcio bore the full brunt of a free-kick, but managed to stay on his feet to complete playing all 630 minutes of the tournament. He was one of four players to do so along with goalkeeper Marcos, right-back captain Cafu, and midfielder Gilberto Silva.

2006 World Cup
In the 2006 World Cup, Lúcio set a FIFA-record by playing 386 consecutive minutes without committing a foul, a streak which was finally broken in Brazil's 1–0 quarter-final loss to France.

In August 2006, Lúcio was appointed as captain by Brazil manager Dunga.

2009 Confederations Cup

Lúcio's next international tournament was 2009 Confederations Cup. On 28 June 2009, the Brazilian captain scored the game-winning goal in the 84th minute for Brazil in the final of the Confederations Cup against the United States. Lúcio converted on a header from an Elano corner-kick, which beat American goalkeeper Tim Howard.

2010 World Cup
The 2010 World Cup was Lúcio's third World Cup. He played in the Seleçãos first match against North Korea on 15 June 2010, leading his team to a narrow 2–1 win. In the tournament, he partnered Juan in defence. In Group E, Brazil won against the Ivory Coast and played a 0–0 draw against Portugal, which was enough to lead Brazil to the knockout stage. Chile was beaten by Brazil, 3–0, and the Seleção made it to the quarter-finals. There Brazil faced the Netherlands, where Wesley Sneijder scored twice for Netherlands to eliminate Brazil after a 2–1 scoreline.

After World Cup 2010
After head coach Dunga was sacked, the Brazil Football Confederation hired Mano Menezes as the side's new head coach. Menezes also had faith in the experienced Lúcio, who kept his starting centre-back role in the team. Even though Lúcio kept his place, his centreback partner Juan was dropped from the Brazilian squad, and Thiago Silva was Lúcio's new partner.

On 4 June 2011, Lúcio played his 100th game for Brazil, which consists of 98 official caps and two unofficial caps in friendly matches against Spanish club Sevilla in 2005 and against Swiss club Luzern in 2006.

2011 Copa América
Lúcio was also named in Brazil's squad for 2011 Copa América. Brazil barely survived the group stage and in the quarter-finals the team faced Paraguay, which eliminated Brazil after a penalty shootout.

Towards the end of 2011, Menezes dropped Lúcio from the Brazil's squad, and Robinho became the new team captain. Lúcio made his last appearance for Brazil in September 2011.

Style of play
Regarded as one of the best defenders of his generation, Lúcio was a tall, large, tenacious, and physically strong defender, who excelled in the air, and was known for his heavy marking of opponents, as well as his hard-tackling style of play and leadership; he was also highly regarded for his positioning, ability to read the game and his adeptness at winning back possession in one on one situations. Gifted with good technical skills, and excellent distribution, although he was usually deployed as a centre-back, he was also used as a defensive midfielder, where he demonstrated his confidence in possession, and ability to play the ball out of defence. Although he was primarily known for his defensive skill and consistency, his pace, stamina and dribbling ability frequently enabled him to get forward into good attacking positions, with his trademark long, surging, galloping runs on the ball, which earned him the nickname O Cavalo ("The Horse", in Portuguese); these attributes, along with his powerful striking ability from distance and on set-pieces with his right foot, made him an additional offensive threat.

Personal life
Lúcio is married to Dione, with whom he has three children: Victoria, João Vítor, and Valentinna. He is an Evangelical Christian, and frequently talks about the way his faith sustains his life in professional football.

Career statistics

Club

International

Scores and results list Brazil's goal tally first, score column indicates score after each Lúcio goal.

HonoursBayer LeverkusenUEFA Champions League runner-up: 2001–02Bayern MunichBundesliga: 2004–05, 2005–06, 2007–08
DFB-Pokal: 2004–05, 2005–06, 2007–08
DFB-Ligapokal: 2004, 2007Inter MilanSerie A: 2009–10
Coppa Italia: 2009–10, 2010–11
UEFA Champions League: 2009–10
Supercoppa Italiana: 2010
FIFA Club World Cup: 2010JuventusSupercoppa Italiana: 2012BrazilFIFA World Cup: 2002
FIFA Confederations Cup: 2005, 2009Individual' Brazilian Bola de Prata: 2000
 kicker'' Bundesliga Team of the Season: 2000–01, 2001–02, 2002–03, 2003–04, 2004–05, 2005–06
 ESM Team of the Year: 2001–02, 2005–06, 2009–10
 2009 FIFA Confederations Cup: Fair Play Award
 2009 FIFA Confederations Cup: FIFA.com Users' Top 11
 FIFA FIFPro World XI: 2010
 Pirata d'Oro (Internazionale Player of the Year): 2012

See also
 List of footballers with 100 or more caps

Notes

References

External links

  
 
 
 
 Lucio's Testimony
 
 
 
 

1978 births
Living people
Association football defenders
Brazilian footballers
Brazilian expatriate footballers
Brazil international footballers
Sport Club Internacional players
FC Bayern Munich footballers
Bayer 04 Leverkusen players
Bayer 04 Leverkusen II players
Inter Milan players
Juventus F.C. players
São Paulo FC players
Sociedade Esportiva Palmeiras players
FC Goa players
Sociedade Esportiva do Gama players
Brasiliense Futebol Clube players
Campeonato Brasileiro Série A players
Campeonato Brasileiro Série D players
Bundesliga players
Serie A players
Expatriate footballers in Germany
Expatriate footballers in Italy
Expatriate footballers in India
Olympic footballers of Brazil
Footballers at the 2000 Summer Olympics
2001 FIFA Confederations Cup players
2002 FIFA World Cup players
2003 FIFA Confederations Cup players
2005 FIFA Confederations Cup players
2006 FIFA World Cup players
2009 FIFA Confederations Cup players
2010 FIFA World Cup players
2011 Copa América players
FIFA World Cup-winning players
FIFA Confederations Cup-winning players
Brazilian evangelicals
FIFA Century Club
Indian Super League marquee players
UEFA Champions League winning players
Indian Super League players
Sportspeople from Federal District (Brazil)